Leonid Sokov (October 11, 1941, Tver region – April 4, 2018 in Copake, New York, United States) was a Russian nonconformist artist and sculptor. He primarily lived and worked in New York City.

Life and work
Sokov was born in Mikhalevo in the Tver region, Russia in 1941 and graduated from the Stroganov Institute now called the Moscow School of Art and Industry, in 1969. He emigrated to the United States in 1980. His compositions are in the Pop style, adapted to Socialist Realism through the use of ideology as an object of consumption. He is closely related to the Sots art movement and he has worked with others in that genre including Dmitry Prigov, Alexander Kosolapov, and Rostislav Lebedev.

In 2001 he represented Russia at the Venice Biennale. He participated in the 2004 Gwangju Biennale in Gwangju, South Korea.

In 2012, the Moscow Museum of Modern Art (MMoMA) honored the artist's 70th birthday with a major retrospective and publication on the artist's career and work.

In 2016, The State Tretyakov Gallery in Moscow held a major retrospective museum show dedicated to the artist's life and work.

Public collections
 The Metropolitan Museum of Art, New York
 Centre Georges Pompidou, Paris, France
 The State Russian Museum, St. Petersburg, Russia
 The State Tretyakov Gallery, Moscow, Russia
 The State Hermitage Museum, St. Petersburg, Russia
 The Solomon R. Guggenheim Museum, New York
 The Moscow Museum of Modern Art (MMoMA), Moscow, Russia
 The National Centre for Contemporary Arts, Moscow, Russia
 The ART4.RU Museum of Contemporary Russian Art, Moscow, Russia
 The Jane Voorhees Zimmerli Art Museum at Rutgers University, USA
 The Nasher Museum of Art at Duke University, USA
 The Cleveland Museum of Art, USA

References 

 Leonid Sokov: Sculptures, Paintings, Objects, Installations, Documents, Articles, Moscow: The State Russian Museum, Palace Editions, 2000.  

1941 births
2018 deaths
21st-century Russian sculptors
20th-century Russian sculptors
20th-century Russian male artists
Russian male sculptors
Soviet Nonconformist Art
Russian contemporary artists
Soviet emigrants to the United States
People from Rzhevsky District
21st-century Russian male artists
Stroganov Moscow State Academy of Arts and Industry alumni